The Sports Authority of India (SAI) is the apex national sports body of India, established in 1982 by the Ministry of Youth Affairs and Sports of Government of India for the development of sports in India. SAI has 2 Sports Academic institutions, 11 "SAI Regional Centres" (SRC), 14 "Centre of Excellence" (COE/COX), 56 "Sports Training Centres" (STC) and 20 Special Area Games (SAG). In addition, SAI also manages Netaji Subhash High Altitude Training Centre (Shilaroo, Himachal Pradesh) as well as 5 stadiums in the national capital of Delhi, such as Jawaharlal Nehru Stadium (also serves as national head office of SAI), Indira Gandhi Arena, Major Dhyan Chand National Stadium, SPM Swimming Pool Complex and Dr. Karni Singh Shooting Range. 

Two "SAI Sports Academic" institutions are Netaji Subhas National Institute of Sports (at Patiala in Punjab) and Lakshmibai National College of Physical Education (at Thiruvananthapuram in Kerala), conducting research and running certificate to PhD level courses in physical education and sports medicine.

Eleven "SAI Regional Centres" (SRC) are located at (clockwise from north) Chandigarh, Zirakpur, Sonipat, Lucknow, Guwahati, Imphal, Kolkata, Bhopal, Bengaluru, Mumbai and Gandhinagar. New regional centre of SAI has been inaugurated at Zirakpur, Punjab. It is the 11th regional centre of Sports Authority of India.

Fourteen "Centre of Excellences" (COE/COX) have a total of nearly 600 trainees in 18 sports (as of 2014), such as Archery, Athletics, Boxing, Cycling, Fencing, Gymnastics, Hockey, Judo, Kabaddi, Kayaking and Canoeing, Rowing, Swimming, Table Tennis, Taekwondo, Volleyball, Weightlifting, Wrestling and Wushu. These COE are at (clockwise from north) Patiala, Sonipat, Hisar (Haryana), Shillong, Imphal, Kolkata, Jagatpur (Odisha), Bhopal, Bengaluru, Thiruvananthapuram, Alappuzha, Kandivali, Aurangabad and Gandhinagar.

Twenty "Special Area Games" (SAG) are located at (clockwise from north) Kargil, Kishanganj (Bihar), Gidhaur (Bihar), Ranchi (Jharkhand), Namchi (Sikkim), Naharlagun (Arunachal Pradesh), Kokrajhar (Assam), Tinsukia (Assam), Imphal (Manipur), Utlou (village in Nambol, Manipur), Agartala (Tripura), Aizawl (Mizoram), Bolpur (West Bengal), Jagatpur (Odisha), Sundergarh (Odisha), Dhar (Madhya Pradesh), Port Blair (Andaman and Nicobar Islands), Alappuzha (Kerala), Tellicherry (Kerala), Mayiladuthurai (Tamil Nadu).

History 
After independence, on  7 May 1961, the National Institute of Sports (NIS) was set up for the development of sports at the Motibagh Palace grounds in Patiala. On 23 January 1973, it was renamed Netaji Subhas National Institute of Sports (NSNIS).

The Sports Authority of India originated with the committee formed to host the 1982 Asian Games in New Delhi. On 25 January 1984, "Sports Authority of India" was established as a registered society by the "Department of Sports"" of Government of India's Ministry of Youth Affairs and Sports. On 1 May 1987, the "Society for National Institute of Physical Education and Sports" (SNIPES) was merged with SAI, and as a result, the Netaji Subhas National Institute of Sports(NSNIS) at Patiala and its allied centres at Bhopal, Bangalore, Kolkata and Gandhinagar and the Lakshmibai National College of Physical Education at Thiruvananthapuram also came under SAI. The Netaji Subhas National Institute of Sports at Patiala and the Lakshmibai National University of Physical Education at Thiruvananthapuram became its academic wings. In 1995, Lakshmibai National University of Physical Education at Gwalior became a separate "Deemed University."

SAI Regional Centres (SRC)s 
 
Clockwise from north:
 SAI Netaji Subhas Regional Centre, Chandigarh, Punjab
 SAI Chaudhary Devi Lal Northern Regional Centre, Sonepat, Haryana 
 SAI Netaji Subhas Regional Centre, Lucknow, Uttar Pradesh
 SAI Netaji Subhas North-East Regional Centre, Guwahati, Assam
 SAI Netaji Subhas North-East Regional Centre, Imphal, Manipur
 SAI Netaji Subhas Eastern Centre, Kolkata, West Bengal 
 SAI Udhav Das Mehta Bhaiji Central Centre, Bhopal, Madhya Pradesh
 SAI Netaji Subhas Southern Centre, Bengaluru, Karnataka 
 SAI Regional Centre, Mumbai, Maharashtra 
 SAI Netaji Subhas Western Centre, Gandhinagar, Gujarat

SAI Academies 

SAI runs following two academic institutes that run graduate and post-graduate  courses in sports medicine, sports and physical education to prepare coaches and allied sports support staff.
 Netaji Subhas National Institute of Sports (NSNIS) at Patiala
 Refresher Courses
 Certificate Course in Sports Coaching via SAI Regional Centres (SRC)s
 Diploma in Sports Coaching
 Post-graduate Diploma Course in Sports medicine
 Master's degree in Sports Coaching
 Lakshmibai National College of Physical Education (LNCPE) at Thiruvananthapuram
 Bachelor of Physical Education (BPE)
 Master of Physical Education (MPE)
 Doctor of Philosophy (PhD) Regular and Part-time

Sports Sciences and Sports Medicine

In 1983, a "Department of Sports Science" was established at "NSNIS Patiala". From 1987 to 1990, "Sports science centres" with "Human Performance Lab" were set up at 4 regional centres in Delhi, Bengaluru, Kolkata and Gandhinagar; basic sports science support staff scheme was implemented for National Athletes; and SAI schemes for children was introduced at various regional centres.

Sports scientists from the fields of anthropometry, sports biomechanics, sports nutrition,  sport psychology, sports physiology, physiotherapy, and physical education (GTMT) undertake the research work to improve the performance of sportsperson in competitions. SAI has technical and research collaboration with various reputed Indian and foreign sports science and medical institutes. Doctors, physiotherapists, psychologists, nutritionists, coaches and experts from these friends are also deployed at SAI academies, regional centres, sports training centres and centre of excellences. SPARRC institute and Indian Institute of Sports Medicine recognized by Indian Government aim to provide non-invasive procedures for sorts injuries with advanced research in sports science.

Training of Elite Athlete Management Support (Teams) Division

This is the backbone of SAI which provides support to the National Sports Federations (NSFs) in the preparation of National Teams which participate in various International events. The TEAMS Division coordinates the Long Term Development Plan of each NSF; provides logistics and training support at various academic institutions and other Regional Centres of SAI and also at selected training centres outside SAI. The TEAMS Division draws most of its funding under the Scheme of “Assistance to National Sports Federations” from Sports Ministry. The TEAMS Division also provides support to the NSFs in the hiring of foreign coaches and selection of the national coach for each NSF, who are responsible for the training of core probables for the National teams.

With active support from TEAMS Division, good results have been achieved in the international arena in the disciplines of Badminton, Judo, Shooting, Archery, Athletics, Weightlifting, Wrestling, Wushu, Boxing and Billiards & Snooker.

Under this Scheme of “Assistance to National Sports Federations”, financial assistance is provided to recognised NSFs for training and participation of teams in international events abroad, organisation of national and international tournaments in India, coaching and training of national teams under Indian and foreign coaches with requisite technical and scientific support, procurement of equipment etc.

Engagement of Foreign Coaches and Experts
It is SAI's constant endeavor to engage expert foreign coaches on short term and long-term basis to train and coach national coaching campers and also to facilitate knowledge exchange with Indian coaches.

National Coaching Camps
In a year, SAI organises a number of national coaching camps in different disciplines in SAI centres and other centres for preparation of Indian teams for various national and international tournaments.

Long Term Development Plan (LTDP)
SAI Long Term Development Plan ( SAI LTDP) aims at the joint preparation of long term sports-specific development plans by National Sports governing bodies and federations of India (NSFs) based on a four-year cycle with yearly review. The plans cover all aspects of sports including development of sportsperson, coaching, participation, promotion, tournament schedule, hosting of major events and sports sciences.

Operations Division
Different sports promotion schemes of SAI, aimed at spotting and nurturing talent are being implemented and monitored through the networks of SAI centres.

SAI Schemes:

SAI Sports Promotional Schemes 
The Sports Authority of India conducts various activities and schemes to promote sports in India. they include:

(i) National Sports Talent Contest Scheme (NSTC)
SAI National Sports Talent Contest Scheme (SAI NSTC) provides the school environment to play and study for talented 8-14 year olds who are at the right age for higher level training in competitive sports. The selection of trainees is done on the basis of performance and potential, and they are admitted to schools on a non-residential basis. The main objectives of the scheme are to:
• Identify educational institutions having good sports infrastructure
• Scientifically scout for optimum-aged talent
• Convert the genetically and physiologically gifted children into future champions
• Ensure availability of trained coaches
• Ensure financial assistance for consumables
• Provide adequate competition exposure and sports equipment to sports institutes and Akharas to create a broader base for modern wrestling

The disciplines covered under SAI NSTC are
 14 Regular schools with 11 disciplines namely Athletics, Basketball, Football, Gymnastics, Hockey, Kho-Kho, Kabaddi, Swimming, Table Tennis, Volleyball and Wrestling.
 10 Indigenous Games & Martial Arts (IGMA) with 9 disciplines, namely, Archery, Kabaddi, Kalaripayatu, Mukna, Thang-Ta, Silambam, Khomlainai, Malkhamb & Gatka.
 Akharas for wrestling

(ii) Army Boys Sports Company (ABSC)
SAI Army Boys Sports Company (SAI ABSC) is a scheme run in collaboration with the Indian Army to nurture and groom talented boys in the age group of 8 to 14 years. These companies act as virtual sports schools where training is scientifically backed up and support facility is provided throughout the training period. The trainees are entitled to an assured career in the Armed Forces at 17½ years. The selection of trainees is done on the basis of performance and potential assessed through a battery of tests. Objectives of this scheme include:
 Nurturing budding talent
 Improving the achievements tally in international sports competitions
 Using the Army's excellent infrastructure and disciplined administrative environment

(iii) SAI Training Centers Scheme (STC)
 
SAI Training Centre Scheme (SAI STC) was created in 1995 by merging "Sports Project Development Area Centres" (SPDA) and "Sports Hostel Scheme". It is run collaboration with the State Government and Union Territory Administrations. The trainees are admitted into the scheme on residential and non-residential basis where they are funded by the government. The main objectives of the scheme are to:
 Train talented young sportspersons aged 12–18 years (Sub-Junior/Junior)
 Identify those who have attained advanced levels of proficiency in sports.
 Identify those who show natural potential in the Olympic disciplines, indigenous and other sports.
 Provide in-house coaching, training and nutritional support to sportspersons.

(iv) Special Area Games Scheme (SAG)
SAI Special Area Games (SAI SAG) are similar to STC, except that the focus of the SAG Centres is on popular indigenous sports of India bu spotting and nurturing talent in specific disciplines in tribal, coastal and hilly areas, to grooms them to achieve excellence in the related modern competitive games and sports. The SAG Centres are fully funded by SAI, and land is to be provided by the respective State Governments or other institutions such as universities and schools. "Special Area Games" (SAG) are located at (clockwise from north):

(v) Extension Centres of STCs/SAGs
SAI Extension Centres of STCs/SAG (SAI ESTC/ESAG) scheme commenced in 2005 to develop sports in schools, colleges and universities having commendable sporting performance and adequate infrastructure. The Extension Centres are monitored by the nearest STC or SAG and Regional Centre Head for their adherence to SAI regulations. Authority to approve these Extension Centres lies with the Director general of SAI.

(vi) Centres of Excellence (CoE)
SAI Centres of Excellence (SAI CoE) identify and train the talented sportspersons in the age group of 12–25 years who have shown promise at the sub-junior, junior and senior National Sports Competitions for 330 days in a year.

"Centre of Excellences" (COE/COX) have a total of nearly 600 trainees in 18 sports (2014 figure), such as archery, athletics, boxing, cycling, fencing, gymnastics, hockey, judo, kabaddi, kayaking and canoeing, rowing, swimming, table tennis, taekwondo, volleyball, weightlifting, wrestling, and wushu.

COE are located at (clockwise from north):

(vii) Come and Play Scheme

SAI Come and Play Scheme (SAI CPS) serves the purpose of talent scouting. Meritorious talent emerging from this scheme forms a pool for induction into regular residential and non-residential sports promotional schemes of STC and SAG.

The scheme was introduced in May 2011 for optimum utilisation of its 5 stadia in Delhi by throwing open the designated areas in the SAI Stadia for community sports. After this scheme received an excellent public response by registering to use the sports facilities in Delhi in disciplines such as Badminton, Boxing, Basketball, Cricket, Cycling, Football, Hockey, Gymnastics, Judo, Shooting, Swimming, Table Tennis, Volleyball, Weightlifting and Wrestling, SAI then extended this scheme to all centres of SAI across India to encourage the youth in the local areas to use sports facilities available at these centres. SAI participated in 2015-16 Calcutta Premier League with a team named SAI Darjeeling.

See also

 Major Dhyan Chand Khel Ratna Award
 
 List of sports events in India
 
 Sports in Asia

External links 

 Sportal, Sports Portal by the Government of India
 Sports Authority of India official site
 Lakshmibai National College of Physical Education official website
 Netaji Subhas National Institute of Sports official website

References 

 
 

Sports governing bodies in India
Ministry of Youth Affairs and Sports
Organisations based in Delhi
Sports organizations established in 1984
1984 establishments in Delhi